Rubén Luis López Quinteros (born 25 June 1961) is a Uruguayan football manager. He is nicknamed El Ronco.

Career
Born in Montevideo, López began his career with Cerrito in 1998. In the 2006–07 season he led Rampla Juniors away from relegation, and finished third in the 2007 Apertura before leaving the club for Juventud de Las Piedras in June 2008. He was sacked from the latter club in September.

López spent a short period in charge of Fénix before returning to Juventud in 2010, but was sacked from the latter in April 2011. He returned to Rampla in November of the following year, but resigned in July 2013.

López was in charge of Central Español during the 2014–15 Uruguayan Segunda División season, before returning to Rampla in 2016 as a sporting director. On 17 April 2017, he was again appointed manager after Fernando Araújo resigned.

López resigned from Rampla on 6 May 2018, and was named sporting director at Sud América the following 25 January. He was an interim manager of the side on two occasions during the 2019 and 2020 campaigns before leaving the club on 1 June 2021, stating a desire to return to managerial duties.

On 5 October 2021, López returned to Sud América, now as manager.

Personal life
López's sons Nicolás and Sebastián are both footballers and forwards.

References

External links

1961 births
Living people
Sportspeople from Montevideo
Uruguayan football managers
Uruguayan Primera División managers
Uruguayan Segunda División managers
El Tanque Sisley managers
Sud América managers
Rampla Juniors managers
Centro Atlético Fénix managers
Central Español managers
Club Sportivo Cerrito managers
Juventud de Las Piedras managers